"Stoney End" is a song written by Laura Nyro and released in February 1967 on her debut album More Than a New Discovery. According to childhood friend Alan Merrill, Nyro originally intended the song, a gospel-inflected uptempo piece, to be performed at a slower pace. The best known recording of Nyro's album version of the song was a hit for Barbra Streisand in 1970. 

Streisand recorded "Stoney End" as the title track of her twelfth studio album. Members of the group Fanny provided backing vocals. The song reached number six on the US Billboard Hot 100 in early 1971 and became Streisand's second Top 10 hit. It also reached number two on the US Adult Contemporary chart. In Canada it peaked at number five.

Chart performance

Weekly charts

Year-end charts

Other versions

 The Stone Poneys, which featured Linda Ronstadt, recorded a country-ish style version of "Stoney End" for their album Linda Ronstadt, Stone Poneys and Friends, Vol. III in 1968. Stoney End song was later included in the 1972 "Stoney End (Stone Poneys album)" compilation of their previously published folk rock music.

 Stoney End was also recorded in 1968 by Peggy Lipton. Her recording reached #121 on the U.S. Billboard Bubbling Under the Hot 100 chart.

 The Blossoms, who sang backing vocals on Peggy Lipton's version, first released it in 1967 as the B-side to the "Wonderful" single, and then again in 1969 as an A-side single

 "Stoney End" had previously been performed by The Chicks. It charted in New Zealand, reaching number 21 in January 1970.

 "Stoney End" has also been recorded by Diana Ross, Beth Nielsen Chapman, Maynard Ferguson, Judy Kuhn and was included as part of a Laura Nyro tribute medley on the 1971 album The 5th Dimension/Live!!.

References

External links

 (1971)  

 

1968 singles
1970 singles
Songs written by Laura Nyro
Laura Nyro songs
Barbra Streisand songs
Columbia Records singles
1967 songs
Song recordings produced by Lou Adler